Isy or ISY may refer to:

 International Space Year, 1992, a designation to promote space exploration
 International School Yangon, Myanmar
 ISY994i, a home automation controller supporting several protocols

See also
 Izzy, a nickname